Semiothisa ozararia (sometimes as Godonela ozararia), is a moth of the family Geometridae first described by Francis Walker in 1860. It is found in the Indian subregion, Sri Lanka, Taiwan, Borneo, Sumatra and Java.

It is a pale brownish to creamy coloured moth. Postmedial line of forewing is found very close proximity to the margin. The caterpillar has a slender whitish body. Head, first thoracic segment and anal segment and clasper are all yellowish brown. Body consists regular pattern of black spots and diamond-shaped spots. Its host plant is Acacia mangium.

References

Moths of Asia
Moths described in 1860
Geometridae